Postman is a 1967 Indian Malayalam-language film, directed and produced by P. A. Thomas. The film stars Sathyan, Kaviyoor Ponnamma, Thikkurissy Sukumaran Nair and Hari. The film's score was composed by B. A. Chidambaranath.

Plot

Cast 
Sathyan
Kaviyoor Ponnamma
Thikkurissy Sukumaran Nair
Hari
O. Ramdas
T. R. Omana
K. P. Ummer
Kamaladevi
K. V. Shanthi

Soundtrack 
The music was composed by B. A. Chidambaranath with lyrics by Vayalar Ramavarma and Irayimman Thampi.

References

External links 
 

1967 films
1960s Malayalam-language films